Patricia Anastastia Martin DeLeon (born 13 July 1944) is a Jamaican reproductive geneticist who is specialists in the male reproductive system. She is the Trustees Distinguished Professor of Biological Sciences at the University of Delaware. In 2010 she was awarded the Presidential Award for Excellence in Science, Mathematics, and Engineering Mentoring by Barack Obama.

Early life and education 
DeLeon was born in Port Maria. She was one of nine children, and had to lobby the principal of her high school, Excelsior High School, to waive the fees to allow her family to attend. She became interested in botany as a child and learnt the Latin names of all the plants that she collected. The principal agreed based on DeLeon's academic performance. She attended the University of the West Indies for her undergraduate studies, where she focussed on zoology and chemistry. After earning her undergraduate degree DeLeon moved to Canada, where she joined the University of Western Ontario for her doctoral degree in microscopic anatomy. She was subsequently a postdoc at McGill University.

Research and career 
In 1976 DeLeon joined the faculty at the University of Delaware. DeLeon has extensively studied the Sperm adhesion molecule 1 (SPAM1), a glycosylphosphatidylinositol linked membrane protein. The mechanisms that underpin the expression of these proteins are poorly understood, but are crucial for the development of assisted reproductive technology. The over-expression of SPAM1 can give rise to cancer. In 2009 she was named the Trustees Distinguished Professor of Biological Sciences. Alongside her work on male fertility, DeLeon has studied particles in the fallopian tube, the understanding of which may improve the outcomes of in vitro fertilisation. She is working on non-invasive diagnostic methods to identify embryos that are most likely to result in successful IVF. 

Throughout her career DeLeon has worked to support undergraduates gain research experience.

Awards and honours 
 2006 Elected to the Executive Council of the American Society of Andrology
 2007 Presidential Award for Excellence in Science, Mathematics, and Engineering Mentoring
 2010 William G. Demas Memorial Lecture
 2011 Caribbean Women in Science Medalist
 2012 50 Most Outstanding Jamaican Women
 2017 Francis Alison Faculty Award

Selected publications

References 

Jamaican women academics
American people of Jamaican descent
University of Delaware faculty
University of the West Indies alumni
University of Western Ontario alumni
1944 births
Living people